Om Shanti Om may refer to:

 Om Shanti Om, 2007 Indian romance film
 Om Shanti Om (TV series), 2017 Indian musical television series

See also
 Om (disambiguation)